Hebbronville is a census-designated place (CDP) in and the county seat of Jim Hogg County, Texas, United States. The population was 4,558 at the 2010 census. In 1918, Helen Sewel Harbison became the first woman in Texas to cast a ballot, two years before the implementation of the Nineteenth Amendment to the United States Constitution.

The Colegio Altamirano, founded by settlers of Spanish ancestry who wanted their children to learn Spanish culture, was an institution in Hebbronville from 1897 until its closing in 1958.

Geography
Hebbronville is located in northern Jim Hogg County at  (27.311259, -98.680998). It is bordered to the east by Las Lomitas and to the north by Duval County.

Texas State Highway 16 (Smith Avenue) passes through the center of town, leading north  to Freer and southwest  to Zapata. Texas State Highway 359 (Viggie Street) leads northwest  to Laredo and northeast  to Alice, while Texas State Highway 285 leads east  to Falfurrias.

Climate
Hebbronville has a borderline humid subtropical climate (Köppen climate classification Cfa)/hot semi-arid climate (Köppen BSh). Summers are very hot and humid: 152 afternoons each year top , with 27.6 afternoons reaching  and during the summer of 2009 eleven afternoons topped . During July and August combined, all but three mornings stay above  and seven mornings per year stay above , with as many as forty mornings staying over this temperature during 1998. The hottest temperature on record has been  on July 9, 2009, and the hottest minimum  on September 30, 2009, followed by  the following day.

During the summer, rain is not common, but when a Gulf of Mexico hurricane moves inland it can be very heavy. From September 11 to 13, 1971, a total of  fell over three days from such a system,  in four days from September 20 to 23 of 1967, and  fell on August 27 and 28, 1909. In contrast, no measurable precipitation fell in Hebbronville from June 10 to September 7 of 1921.

Temperatures decline slowly during the "fall" season, remaining hot through until the end of October, by which time most danger of flooding from a remnant hurricane has passed. The winter months are warm and usually dry, although occasionally an easterly flow will produce substantial rainfall. Frosts do occasionally occur during the winter – 9.9 mornings fall to or below freezing during an average winter – but measurable snow has fallen in Hebbronville only three times in 112 years – on March 10, 1932, on January 20, 1940 during South Texas' coolest month on record, and on Christmas Day of 2004 when  fell in a famous "White Christmas".

Origin
Hebbronville is located on land which once formed part of Las Noriecitas, one of the earliest ranches founded in the area.

The town's namesake, James Richard Hebbron, acquired land, in about 1880, from the descendants of the original grantee, Ignacio Benavides. With two others, he bought , in what was then Duval County, just above Peña. One of his sons, Arthur Hebbron, came down from California and took charge of running his ranch.

Hebbronville itself was created in 1883, when the Texas-Mexican Railway Company built a railroad through the area. Francisco P. Peña, operator of Peña Station on this route, refused to sell any land to the Texas-Mexican for a townsite. The company then approached J. R. Hebbron, who arranged for the sale of land for the new townsite, near Peñitas. The old train station at Peñitas was then loaded onto a flatcar, moved 1½ miles west and named Hebbronville.

For a time, Hebbronville ranked as the largest cattle-shipping center in the country, and it continues to be a hub of ranching activity.

A photograph of James R. Hebbron hangs in the Jim Hogg County Courthouse at 102 East Tilley Street in Hebbronville. He was born in 1828, in London, England, but spent most of his adult life in California, mainly around Salinas dying there in 1926.

Demographics

2020 census

As of the 2020 United States census, there were 4,101 people, 1,378 households, and 992 families residing in the CDP.

2000 census
As of the census of 2000, there were 4,498 people, 1,554 households, and 1,165 families residing in the CDP. The population density was 763.4 people per square mile (294.9/km2). There were 1,853 housing units at an average density of 314.5 per square mile (121.5/km2). The racial makeup of the CDP was 81.79% White, 0.53% African American, 0.89% Native American, 0.18% Asian, 14.81% from other races, and 1.80% from two or more races. Hispanic or Latino of any race were 90.55% of the population.

There were 1,554 households, out of which 38.1% had children under the age of 18 living with them, 54.6% were married couples living together, 15.2% had a female householder with no husband present, and 25.0% were non-families. 23.4% of all households were made up of individuals, and 12.9% had someone living alone who was 65 years of age or older. The average household size was 2.87 and the average family size was 3.41.

In the CDP, the population was spread out, with 31.1% under the age of 18, 8.1% from 18 to 24, 24.2% from 25 to 44, 21.1% from 45 to 64, and 15.5% who were 65 years of age or older. The median age was 34 years. For every 100 females, there were 95.9 males. For every 100 females age 18 and over, there were 90.4 males.

The median income for a household in the CDP was $24,558, and the median income for a family was $29,358. Males had a median income of $27,042 versus $17,772 for females. The per capita income for the CDP was $12,271. About 25.2% of families and 25.9% of the population were below the poverty line, including 28.5% of those under age 18 and 32.0% of those age 65 or over.

Education
Hebbronville, as with all of Jim Hogg County, is served by the Jim Hogg County Independent School District.
El Cenizo Headstart is a Federally funded educational program for 3-5-year-old students. It operates on the same schedule as the district.
The district has three schools, all within the town: Hebbronville Elementary School, Hebbronville Junior High School, and Hebbronville High School.

References

External links
 Photograph of James R. Hebbron

Census-designated places in Jim Hogg County, Texas
Census-designated places in Texas
County seats in Texas
Populated places established in 1883
1883 establishments in Texas